Factoryville is a borough in Wyoming County, Pennsylvania, United States. The population was 1,146 at the 2020 census.

Factoryville was named for a woolen factory near the original town site.

Geography
Factoryville is located at  (41.564042, -75.781516).

Demographics

As of the census of 2010, there were 1,158 people, 341 households, and 211 families residing in the borough. The population density was 1,654.3 people per square mile (638.7/km2). There were 365 housing units at an average density of 521.4 per square mile (203.7/km2). The racial makeup of the borough was 92.5% White, 4.6% African American, 0.1% Native American, 0.7% Asian, 0.7% from other races, and 1.5% from two or more races. Hispanic or Latino of any race were 4% of the population.

There were 341 households, out of which 24.3% had children under the age of 18 living with them, 43.1% were married couples living together, 15% had a female householder with no husband present, and 38.1% were non-families. 29.6% of all households were made up of individuals, and 12.3% had someone living alone who was 65 years of age or older. The average household size was 2.43 and the average family size was 3.06.

In the borough the age distribution of the population shows 15.6% under the age of 18, 75.2% from 18 to 64, and 9.2% who were 65 years of age or older. The median age was 23.6 years.

The median income for a household in Factoryville was $43,482, and the median income for a family was $63,929. Males had a median income of $37,344 versus $26,859 for females. The per capita income for the borough was $16,926. About 1.6% of families and 7.6% of the population were below the poverty line, including none of those under age 18 and 16.5% of those age 65 or over.

Government
Michael Taylor Callum is the mayor of Factoryville.

Council

Christy Mathewson Day

The second Saturday in August every year is recognized as a holiday in Factoryville. Christy Mathewson Day celebrates the baseball Hall-of-Famer who was born in Factoryville on August 12, 1880. The festivities include a parade from Keystone College to Christy Mathewson Park, a 6 km foot race (in honor of Mathewson's nickname, "The Big 6"), a chicken barbecue, games and many other activities.

Christy Mathewson Day weekend and the town of Factoryville are the subjects of the documentary, "Christy Mathewson Day."

References

How Factoryville Was Born by Allean Derr (1939–2013) – Factoryville Public Library
http://factoryville.org/general-info/history

External links

 Borough of Factoryville

Populated places established in 1798
Boroughs in Wyoming County, Pennsylvania
1824 establishments in Pennsylvania